The Camden Public Library is the public library serving Camden, Maine, United States.
It is a National Historic Landmark and is listed on the National Register of Historic Places.

Description
The library is located at 55 Main Street on the north bank of the Megunticook River, on the north end of the Chestnut Street Historic District.

History
The first library established in Camden was known as the Federal Society's Library, and was started in 1796 with a collection of 200 books. At that time, Camden was a very small town consisting of 15 houses centered on the harbor. The Federal Society's Library operated for 34 years until the books were sold at auction.

In 1854, the Ladies’ Library Association opened on Wood Street. The library later moved to the second floor of the Camden National Bank building and remained at this location until the fire of 1892 that destroyed the Camden business district.

On March 23, 1896, the citizens of Camden voted to establish a free public library, which was to be known as the Camden Public Library. The townspeople of Camden raised the money to build this library through various local fundraising efforts. No assistance was provided by the philanthropist Andrew Carnegie. Mary Louise Curtis Bok donated the land for the library in 1916. Parker Morse Hooper and Boston architect Charles G. Loring offered building plans. The cornerstone was laid on August 17, 1927 and the Library opened its doors on June 11, 1928 with Miss Katherine W. Harding serving as the first librarian. The grounds of the library, including an amphitheater, were designed by noted landscape architect Fletcher Steele.  The library and its grounds were designated a National Historic Landmark on February 27, 2013, recognized as a rare public work by Steele, and as a forerunner of modern landscape design.

In 1996 the library underwent a great expansion under the south lawn.

The library is one of the only libraries in Maine designated as a "Star Library" by Library Journal.

See also

 List of National Historic Landmarks in Maine
 National Register of Historic Places listings in Knox County, Maine

References

External links

 
 Town of Camden, Maine

Library buildings completed in 1928
Public libraries in Maine
Libraries on the National Register of Historic Places in Maine
Libraries in Knox County, Maine
National Historic Landmarks in Maine
Buildings and structures in Camden, Maine
1928 establishments in Maine
National Register of Historic Places in Knox County, Maine